Laure Savasta (born March 18, 1974, in Marseille) is a French professional basketball player. She plays both point guard and shooting guard. She was, with Isabelle Fijalkowski, amongst the first French players to ever play in the WNBA. Savasta played for the Sacramento Monarchs in the WNBA and was a member of the French national team. She became the only female basketball coach for a professional basketball team.

Life
She was the captain and one of the key players of Tarbes GB, taking part to the French championship and European competitions.  Now retired, she started a career of basketball coach and TV commentator, on Sport+, for women's basketball games.

She became the only female basketball coach for a professional basketball team in France when she was given the position at Tarbes Gespe Bigorre.

Career

Highlights

French national team
  Champion of Eurobasket Women in 2001
 5th at the 2000 Summer Olympics of Sydney

Club
  Runner-up of the European Cup Liliana Ronchetti in 1998 with Aix-en-Provence and 2002 with Tarbes;
  Runner-up of the French championship in 1999 and 2000 with Valenciennes, in 2003 with Tarbes;
  Runner up of the French Cup in 1998.

References

External links
  Official website
  Her player profile on TGBÉLITE.com

1974 births
Living people
French women's basketball players
French expatriate basketball people in the United States
Basketball players at the 2000 Summer Olympics
Olympic basketball players of France
Sportspeople from Marseille
Sacramento Monarchs players
Tarbes Gespe Bigorre players
Washington Huskies women's basketball players
Point guards